Peter John "Jack" Wagner II (born October 3, 1959) is an American actor and singer who has appeared in roles on the soap operas General Hospital, Santa Barbara, The Bold and the Beautiful, and Melrose Place.

Early life
Wagner was born in Washington, Missouri to Peter John Wagner, a car salesman (died 1990), and Scotty Wagner, a homemaker. He has a brother, Dennis. Raised Catholic, he attended St. Gertrude's parochial school and St. Francis Borgia Regional High School in his hometown, where he played football and basketball. He attended the University of Missouri for one year, then junior college before eventually enrolling at the University of Arizona, where he tried out for the golf team and drama department. The drama department offered him a full scholarship.

Acting career
Wagner first appeared on the scene in 1982 in the role of Clint Masterson, in Douglas Marland's short-lived cable soap opera, A New Day In Eden (co-produced by Susan Flannery, who would later be Wagner's co-star on The Bold and the Beautiful).

His most famous role has been Frisco Jones on the soap opera General Hospital (1983–1987, 1989–1991, 1994–95, 2013). He was half of a supercouple with Kristina Wagner's Felicia and played the father of Georgie and Maxie Jones.

He also played Warren Lockridge on Santa Barbara from 1991 until that series' conclusion in 1993.

He appeared in several made for television films, including Moving Target with Jason Bateman, Lady Killer with Judith Light, Frequent Flyer with Joan Severance, Nicole Eggert, and Shelley Hack, and Dirty Little Secret opposite Tracey Gold.

He appeared for many years on Aaron Spelling's Fox nighttime soap opera Melrose Place, as the alternately caring/conniving Dr. Peter Burns (1994–99); he directed episodes as well. His character and Heather Locklear's "Amanda" were featured together on a beach in the series finale's closing scene, having faked their own deaths.

He appeared in another Aaron Spelling project, the NBC television series Titans with Yasmine Bleeth in 2000, and in Spelling's daytime soap opera Sunset Beach in 1997.

From 2003 to 2012, he played Nick Marone on the CBS daytime soap The Bold and the Beautiful. On February 28, 2006, he and a contestant Christine Denos won $142,550 (including the standard $100,000 top prize) in the game show Wheel of Fortune; at the time, it set a single-episode largest winning record (and second largest overall) until Michelle Lowenstein surpassed said record on October 14, 2008, as the inaugural $1,000,000 winner.

In 1985, Wagner was nominated for a Daytime Emmy Award for "Best Younger Actor" for his work on General Hospital. He was nominated again in 2005 for "Best Lead Actor" for The Bold and the Beautiful.

Wagner guest-starred on primetime television in notable programs such as Monk, Hot in Cleveland, and Castle.

In January 2013, it was announced that Wagner had agreed to reprise the iconic role of Frisco Jones on General Hospital for several episodes in early 2013. In 2014, he played Bill Avery on When Calls the Heart. Wagner also starred on the Hallmark Channel in the Wedding March movies, with The Wedding March 3: Here Comes the Bride premiering in February 2018  and the 2022 Netflix Christmas Movie Falling for Christmas in 2022.

Dancing with the Stars
In 2012, Wagner was a contestant on season 14 of Dancing with the Stars, partnered with professional dancer Anna Trebunskaya.  They were eliminated from the competition on April 3, 2012, placing 11th.

Singing and stage career
Wagner has recorded six albums. In 1985, he topped the Billboard charts with the ballad "All I Need". The single reached #2 on the Billboard Hot 100 and hit #1 on the Adult Contemporary chart.

Discography

Albums
1984: All I Need - U.S. #44
1985: Lighting Up the Night - U.S. #150
1987: Don't Give Up Your Day Job - U.S. #151
1993: Alone in the Crowd
2005: Dancing in the Moonlight
2014: On the Porch

Singles

Although Wagner had been playing the guitar since he was 14, his initial audition for the role of Frisco Jones on General Hospital with producer Gloria Monty did not include any singing. Wagner had five auditions with ABC before ultimately winning the role of Frisco Jones. His final audition in 1983 included performing the Kenny Loggins song "Wait a Little While".  ABC musical honcho Kelli Ross hooked Wagner up with her good friend in legendary producer Quincy Jones who oversaw his initial 5 song EP All I Need. Eventually, they would release a full ten song LP of All I Need once the song "All I Need" began to rise up the charts. Quincy Jones protégés Glen Ballard and Clif Magness produced Wagner's first two albums on Qwest Records/Warner Brothers. Wagner's singing talents led him to appearances on American Bandstand, Solid Gold, Soul Train and The Merv Griffin Show.

Eventually, his musical theater talent led to the title role(s) in a Broadway run of Jekyll & Hyde, making him the first celebrity casting. Wagner has stated this was "a role of a lifetime" and performing the dual characters on Broadway was his most fulfilling professional experience. Wagner says "the role I had the most fun playing, TV-wise, would be Dr. Peter Burns (Melrose Place). He was sort of an evil character who could redeem himself. Theatrically, it was when I played Dr. Jekyll and Mr. Hyde in Jekyll & Hyde on Broadway." He also appeared in a national theatre tour in 1987 in the role of Tony in West Side Story, and a national tour of Grease in 1988.

While he toured as a rock/pop performer in concert consistently from 1985 to 1988, Wagner did not perform in the 1990s except for an occasional benefit appearance.  In 2005, Wagner resumed performing in concert sporadically. His more recent concerts have included a diverse blend of songs from his own catalog, cover songs from artists such as Neil Young, Lindsey Buckingham, and Paul McCartney, and originals.

In 2012, Wagner released new music, the single "Will the Rain Fall Down" on iTunes. He also performed the song acoustically on The Bold and the Beautiful.

In 2014, Wagner released the full-length release On the Porch.  A notable song from this release was the fan-favorite "The Right Key", which made its debut on General Hospital in 1989.  He made a music video for "Driving Miss Daisy" which premiered on YouTube.

Filmography

Film

Television

Personal life
Wagner was married to actress Kristina Wagner, who played opposite him on General Hospital as his love interest Felicia Cummings. After marital troubles they filed for divorce and it was finalized in 2006.

They have two sons, born in 1990 and 1994. Their younger son died in Los Angeles on June 6, 2022, at age 27. A drug overdose is suspected, pending toxicology results. On June 13, 2022, Jack and his former wife announced a scholarship fund in honour of their son who struggled with addiction issues. All funds donated to the Harrison Wagner Scholarship Fund will be used to directly help young men pay their rent or a portion of their rent who could not otherwise afford their care at New Life House (a sober living facility in California).

Wagner began dating his Melrose Place love interest Heather Locklear in 2007; they became engaged in August 2011. The couple called off their engagement on November 15, 2011.

In May 2013,  Wagner confirmed to Soaps In Depth that he and  his former The Bold and the Beautiful co-star Ashley Jones had been dating for about a year. They were no longer together as of 2015.

In November 2011, Jack met his 23-year-old daughter, Kerry, for the first time at a concert in Florida. Kerry had been placed for adoption at birth by her birth mother and had recently hired a private investigator to find her biological parents. This was the subject of Wagner's "personal story" in his Dancing with the Stars performance on April 2, 2012.

Wagner is a golfer and is the only non-professional athlete to have won the American Century Celebrity Golf Classic, an annual competition featuring American sports and entertainment celebrities. Wagner first won the event in 2006 and repeated as champion in 2011, when he bested Dallas Cowboys quarterback Tony Romo. He has a total of nineteen top ten finishes. The tournament, televised by NBC in July, is played over three rounds at Edgewood Tahoe Golf Course in Lake Tahoe.

Wagner also won the Missouri junior college championship in 1980, and at one point considered a career in pro golf. He has a Celebrity Golf Classic named after him that raises funds for the Leukemia & Lymphoma Society. Wagner created the event to support the Society's mission to cure such cancers as leukemia, lymphoma, Hodgkin's disease, and myeloma, and to improve the quality of life of patients and their families. The Golf Classic raised more than $600,000 in its first two years to fund critical cancer research and patient services.

References

External links

American male television actors
American male soap opera actors
American male singers
People from Washington, Missouri
1959 births
Qwest Records artists
Living people
Male actors from Missouri